Zafirov or female version Zafirova ( is a Bulgarian surname. Notable people with the surname include:

Adalbert Zafirov (born 1969), Bulgarian footballer
Dalia Zafirova (born 1991), Bulgarian tennis player
Erika Zafirova
Ivan Zafirov (born 1947), Bulgarian footballer
Ivaylo Zafirov (born 1992), Bulgarian footballer
Krasimir Zafirov (born 1950), Bulgarian footballer
Martin Zafirov
Neli Zafirova (born 1976), Bulgarian sprint canoer
Vladimir Zafirov (born 1983), Bulgarian footballer

Bulgarian-language surnames
Macedonian-language surnames